The Namibia People's Liberation Front was an alliance of moderate political parties in Namibia. It was formed in 1978 by the Voice of the People Party, the Damara Executive Committee and the Bondelswarts Council. The Damara Christian Democratic Party joined the NPLF in 1979, but withdrew in 1986.

References

1978 establishments in South West Africa
Defunct political parties in Namibia
Political parties established in 1978
Political party alliances in Namibia